Pshdar District is a district of the Sulaymaniyah Governorate in the Kurdistan Region, Iraq. It is located east of the city of Sulaymaniyah, near the Iranian border. The most populous urban centre in the district is Qaladiza, with 220,836 inhabitants.

References 

Districts of Sulaymaniyah Province
Geography of Iraqi Kurdistan